The 2018 Tour of Croatia was a road cycling stage race that took place in Croatia between 17 and 22 April 2018. It was the fourth edition of the Tour of Croatia since its revival in 2015, and was rated as a 2.HC event as part of the 2018 UCI Europe Tour.

The race was won by 's Kanstantsin Sivtsov.

Teams
Nineteen teams were invited to start the race. These included three UCI WorldTeams, 11 UCI Professional Continental teams and five UCI Continental teams.

Schedule

Stages

Stage 1
17 April 2018 — Osijek to Koprivnica,

Stage 2
18 April 2018 — Karlovac to Zadar,

Stage 3
19 April 2018 — Trogir–Okrug to Sveti Jure–Biokovo,

Stage 4
20 April 2018 — Starigrad to Crikvenica,

Stage 5
21 April 2018 — Rabac to Učka,

Stage 6
22 April 2018 — Samobor to Zagreb,

Classification leadership table
In the 2018 Tour of Croatia, four different jerseys were awarded. The general classification was calculated by adding each cyclist's finishing times on each stage, and allowing time bonuses for the first three finishers at intermediate sprints (three seconds to first, two seconds to second and one second to third) and at the finish of mass-start stages; these were awarded to the first three finishers on all stages: the stage winner won a ten-second bonus, with six and four seconds for the second and third riders respectively. The leader of the classification received a red jersey; it was considered the most important of the 2018 Tour of Croatia, and the winner of the classification was considered the winner of the race.

Additionally, there was a points classification, which awarded a blue jersey. In the points classification, cyclists received points for finishing in the top 15 in a stage. For winning a stage, a rider earned 25 points, with 20 for second, 16 for third, 14 for fourth, 12 for fifth, 10 for sixth and a point fewer per place down to 1 point for 15th place. Points towards the classification could also be accrued – awarded on a 5–3–1 scale – at intermediate sprint points during each stage; these intermediate sprints also offered bonus seconds towards the general classification as noted above.

There was also a mountains classification, the leadership of which was marked by a green jersey. In the mountains classification, points towards the classification were won by reaching the top of a climb before other cyclists. Each climb was categorised as either hors, first, second, or third-category, with more points available for the higher-categorised climbs. The fourth and final jersey represented the classification for young riders, marked by a white jersey. This was decided the same way as the general classification, but only riders born after 1 January 1996 were eligible to be ranked in the classification. There was also a classification for teams, in which the times of the best three cyclists per team on each stage were added together; the leading team at the end of the race was the team with the lowest total time.

Final standings

General classification

Points classification

Mountains classification

Young rider classification

Teams classification

References

External links

2018 UCI Europe Tour
2018 in Croatian sport
2018